Anissa may refer to:

"Anissa" (song), a song by French singer Wejdene

People with the given name
Anissa Abi-Dargham, American psychiatrist and member of the faculty of Columbia University
Anissa Helou (born 1952), cookbook author, teacher, and chef
Anissa Jones (1958-1976), American child actress
Anissa Mack (born 1970), American contemporary artist
Anissa Meksen (born 1988) French kick boxer
Anissa Pierce, real identity of DC Comics superhero Thunder